Qikiqta (ᕿᑭᖅᑕ) formerly Beloeil Island is an uninhabited island located in the Qikiqtaaluk Region of Nunavut, Canada. It is separated from Baffin Island by Albert Harbour. The closest community is the Inuit hamlet of Pond Inlet,  to the southwest.

References

External links 
 Beloeil Island in the Atlas of Canada - Toporama; Natural Resources Canada

Islands of Baffin Island
Uninhabited islands of Qikiqtaaluk Region